Coalfalls is a suburb of Ipswich in the City of Ipswich, Queensland, Australia.

History 
The origin of the suburb name comes from James Blair's house, Coalfalls, which in turn probably takes its name from the sighting of coal seams in this area, most notably along the banks of the Bremer River.

Education 
There are no schools in Coalfalls. The nearest government primary school is Blair State School in neighbouring Sadliers Crossing to the south. Then nearest government secondary school is Ipswich State High School in neighbouring Brassall to the north.

References

External links
 

Suburbs of Ipswich, Queensland